The 1979 Braintree District Council election took place on 3 May 1979 to elect members of Braintree District Council in England. This was on the same day as the 1979 UK general election and other local elections across the United Kingdom.

At the election, the Conservatives lost control of the council to no overall control despite remaining the largest party.

Summary

Election result

|}

Ward results

Black Notley

Bocking North

Bocking South

Braintree Central

Braintree East

Braintree West

Bumpstead

Castle Headingham

 

 

No Independent Liberal candidate as previous (17.9%).

Coggeshall

Colne Engaine & Greenstead Green

Cressing

 
 

 

No Labour candidate as previous (21.7%).

Earls Colne

Gosfield

Halstead Holy Trinity

Halstead St. Andrew's

Hatfield Peverel

 
 
 

 

No Independent candidate as previous (38.9%).

Kelvedon

 
 
 
 
 

 

No Indepenent (Andrews, Kentish) candidates as previous (54.6%, 36.0%).

Panfield

Rayne

 

 

No Liberal candidate as previous (20.0%).

Sible Headingham

Stour Valley Central

Stour Valley North

Stour Valley South

Terling

Three Fields

Upper Colne

Witham Central

Witham Chipping Hill

Witham North

Witham Silver End & Rivenhall

Witham South

Witham West

Yeldham

References

Braintree District Council elections
1979 English local elections
May 1979 events in the United Kingdom
1970s in Essex